Gert "Charly" Dörfel (born 18 September 1939) is a German former professional footballer who played as a striker or winger.

Playing career 
Dörfel won the 1960 West German championship and spent nine seasons in the Bundesliga after its introduction with Hamburger SV, where he appeared in 224 matches and scored 58 goals. In 1972, he went abroad to South Africa to play with Highlands Park F.C. After one season in the National Professional Soccer League he returned to Germany to play with HSV Barmbek-Uhlenhorst. Within a year he returned to South Africa, and went overseas to Canada in 1976 to play with London City in the National Soccer League.

International career 
He represented West Germany 11 times, including at the 1962 FIFA World Cup qualifiers against Northern Ireland (scoring two goals) and Greece (scoring one goal), the 1966 FIFA World Cup qualifier against Sweden, and eight friendlies.

Personal life 
His brother Bernd Dörfel also played for Germany. After retiring as a footballer, he worked for many years as a clown with engagements at among others Circus Krone.

Honours
Hamburger SV
 German football championship: 1960
 DFB-Pokal: 1962–63; runner-up: 1966–67
 UEFA Cup Winners' Cup runner-up: 1967–68

References

External links
 
 
 

1939 births
German circus performers
German clowns
Living people
Footballers from Hamburg
German footballers
Association football forwards
Germany international footballers
Bundesliga players
Hamburger SV players
London City players
Canadian National Soccer League players
West German expatriate footballers
West German expatriate sportspeople in Canada
Expatriate soccer players in Canada
Expatriate soccer players in South Africa
West German expatriate sportspeople in South Africa
Highlands Park F.C. players
West German footballers